There are over 20,000 Grade II* listed buildings in England. This page is a list of these buildings in the district of Gravesham in Kent.

Gravesham

|}

Notes

External links

Grade II* listed buildings in Kent
Lists of Grade II* listed buildings in Kent
Gravesham